Argyreia is a genus of plants in the family Convolvulaceae.

Species
The following species are recognised in the genus Argyreia:  

 Argyreia adpressa (Choisy) Boerl.
 Argyreia akoensis  S.Z.Yang, P.H.Chen & Staples
 Argyreia albiflora Staples & Traiperm
 Argyreia androyensis Deroin
 Argyreia ankylophlebia Traiperm & Staples
 Argyreia apoensis (Elmer) Ooststr.
 Argyreia arakuensis N.P.Balakr.
 Argyreia argentea (Roxb.) Sweet
 Argyreia atropurpurea (Wall.) Raizada
 Argyreia baoshanensis S.H.Huang
 Argyreia barbata (Wall.) Raizada
 Argyreia barbigera Choisy
 Argyreia barnesii (Merr.) Ooststr.
 Argyreia baronii Deroin
 Argyreia bella (C.B.Clarke) Raizada
 Argyreia bifrons Ooststr.
 Argyreia boholensis (Merr.) Ooststr.
 Argyreia boseana Santapau & Patel
 Argyreia bracteata Choisy
 Argyreia bracteosa (C.B.Clarke) Raizada
 Argyreia breviscapa (Kerr) Ooststr.
 Argyreia capitiformis (Poir.) Ooststr.
 Argyreia caudata Ooststr.
 Argyreia celebica Ooststr.
 Argyreia cheliensis C.Y.Wu
 Argyreia cinerea Ooststr.
 Argyreia coacta (C.B.Clarke) Alston
 Argyreia collinsiae (Craib) Na Songkhla & Traiperm
 Argyreia confusa (Prain) Thoth.
 Argyreia congesta Ooststr.
 Argyreia coonoorensis W.W.Sm. & Ramaswami
 Argyreia corneri Hoogland
 Argyreia crispa Ooststr.
 Argyreia cucullata Ooststr.
 Argyreia cuneata (Willd.) Ker Gawl.
 Argyreia cymosa (Roxb.) Sweet
 Argyreia daltonii C.B.Clarke
 Argyreia discolor Ooststr.
 Argyreia dokmaihom Traiperm & Staples
 Argyreia elliptica (Roth) Choisy
 Argyreia elongata Forman
 Argyreia erinacea Ooststr.
 Argyreia eriocephala C.Y.Wu
 Argyreia formosana Ishig. ex T.Yamaz.
 Argyreia fulgens Choisy
 Argyreia fulvocymosa C.Y.Wu
 Argyreia fulvovillosa C.Y.Wu & S.H.Huang
 Argyreia glabra Choisy
 Argyreia hancorniifolia Gardner ex Thwaites
 Argyreia henryi (Craib) Craib
 Argyreia hirsuta Wight & Arn.
 Argyreia hirsutissima (C.B.Clarke) Thoth.
 Argyreia hookeri C.B.Clarke
 Argyreia hylophila (Kerr) Staples & Traiperm
 Argyreia inaequisepala Traiperm & Staples
 Argyreia involucrata C.B.Clarke
 Argyreia ionantha (Kerr) Khunwasi & Traiperm
 Argyreia kerrii Craib
 Argyreia kleiniana (Schult.) Raizada
 Argyreia kondaparthiensis P.Daniel & Vajr.
 Argyreia kunstleri (Prain) Ooststr.
 Argyreia kurzii (C.B.Clarke) Boerl.
 Argyreia lamii Ooststr.
 Argyreia lanceolata Choisy
 Argyreia laotica Gagnep.
 Argyreia lawii C.B.Clarke
 Argyreia leschenaultii Choisy
 Argyreia leucantha Traiperm & Staples
 Argyreia linggaensis Ooststr.
 Argyreia longifolia (Collett & Hemsl.) Raizada
 Argyreia longipes (Gagnep.) Traiperm & Staples
 Argyreia luzonensis (Hallier f.) Ooststr.
 Argyreia maingayi (C.B.Clarke) Hoogland
 Argyreia marlipoensis C.Y.Wu & S.H.Huang
 Argyreia mastersii (Prain) Raizada
 Argyreia maymyensis (Lace) Raizada
 Argyreia mekongensis Gagnep. & Courchet
 Argyreia melvillei (S.Moore) Staples
 Argyreia micrantha Ooststr.
 Argyreia mollis (Burm.f.) Choisy
 Argyreia monglaensis C.Y.Wu & S.H.Huang
 Argyreia monosperma C.Y.Wu
 Argyreia nana (Collett & Hemsl.) S.Shalini, Lakshmin. & D.Maity
 Argyreia nellygherya Choisy
 Argyreia nervosa (Burm.f.) Bojer
 Argyreia nitida (Desr.) Choisy
 Argyreia nuda Ooststr.
 Argyreia oblongifolia Ooststr.
 Argyreia obtusifolia Lour.
 Argyreia onilahiensis Deroin
 Argyreia ooststroomii Hoogland
 Argyreia osyrensis (Roth) Choisy
 Argyreia paivae A.R.Simões & P.Silveira
 Argyreia pallida Choisy
 Argyreia parviflora (Ridl.) Ooststr.
 Argyreia paucinervia Ooststr.
 Argyreia pedicellata Ooststr.
 Argyreia penangiana (Choisy) Boerl.
 Argyreia philippinensis (Merr.) Ooststr.
 Argyreia pierreana Bois
 Argyreia pilosa Wight & Arn.
 Argyreia popahensis (Collett & Hemsl.) Staples
 Argyreia pseudorubicunda Ooststr.
 Argyreia reinwardtiana (Blume) Miq.
 Argyreia reticulata (Prain) Hoogland
 Argyreia ridleyi (Prain) Ooststr.
 Argyreia robinsonii (Ridl.) Ooststr.
 Argyreia roseopurpurea (Kerr) Ooststr.
 Argyreia roxburghii (Sweet) Choisy
 Argyreia rubicunda Choisy
 Argyreia samarensis Ooststr.
 Argyreia scortechinii (Prain) Prain ex Hoogl.
 Argyreia sericea Dalzell & A.Gibson
 Argyreia setosa (Roxb.) Sweet
 Argyreia sharatchanderji
 Argyreia siamensis (Craib) Staples
 Argyreia sikkimensis  C.B.Clarke) Ooststr.
 Argyreia sorsogonensis Ooststr. ex Staples & Traiperm
 Argyreia sphaerocephala (Prain) Prain ex Hoogl.
 Argyreia splendens (Hornem.) Sweet
 Argyreia srinivasanii Subba Rao & Kumari
 Argyreia stenophylla (Kerr) Staples & Traiperm
 Argyreia strigillosa C.Y.Wu
 Argyreia suddeeana Traiperm & Staples
 Argyreia sumbawana Ooststr.
 Argyreia thomsonii (C.B.Clarke) Babu
 Argyreia thorelii Gagnep.
 Argyreia thwaitesii (C.B.Clarke) D.F.Austin
 Argyreia tomentosa Choisy
 Argyreia vahibora Deroin
 Argyreia variabilis Traiperm & Staples
 Argyreia velutina C.Y.Wu
 Argyreia venusta Choisy
 Argyreia versicolor (Kerr) Staples & Traiperm
 Argyreia wallichii Choisy
 Argyreia walshae Ooststr.
 Argyreia zeylanica (Gaertn.) Voigt

References

 Loureiro 1790. Flora Cochinchinensis 1: 95, 134.

 
Convolvulaceae genera
Taxa named by João de Loureiro
Taxa described in 1790